Michael Doe (died 5 August 1990) was a British-Liberian businessman. He was the owner of the Hotel Africa and was murdered on 5 August 1990 by Independent National Patriotic Front of Liberia (INPFL) Field Marshal Prince Johnson and thrown off the balcony of the 4th floor of the hotel.

References

Liberian businesspeople
1990 deaths
Year of birth missing
Place of birth missing